is a light novel, visual novel and anime television series created by Hina Futaba and Mutsumi Sasaki. The anime aired in Japan in 2004. It replaced Sister Princess as Dengeki G's Magazine premiere flagship title.

Story
The story begins with Nozomu Futami returning to the town where he was born and raised as a child. He moves in near a shrine which houses a legendary stone that was rumoured to have been the place where twin girls turned into birds. The stone is rumoured to be the cause of an abundance of twin girls who are born in the town. The twins who turned into birds did so because of their love for a man who couldn't choose between them. Shortly after Nozomu enters town he begins to run into the same problems as six pairs of twins fight for his love.

Characters

Nozumu is voiced by Motoki Takagi.
The main character of the anime. He is a childhood friend of the Ichijō twins and helps the Sakurazuki twins through the "trials" set by their father.
 and 
Sumireko is voiced by Ami Koshimizu and Kaoruko is voiced by Yui Horie.
Twin girls who are Nozomu's childhood friends. They also attend the same school as Nozomu throughout the anime. They both harbor secret feelings for Nozomu. In kindergarten, they said they would both marry him. Although they are close, they keep their feelings secret from each other and everyone else.
 and 
Yura is voiced by Hiromi Tsunakake and Kira is voiced by Yui Itsuki.
It is explained during the story that these twin girls lived a luxury life together in their mansion. Their father travels often and employs their butler to take care of them. They undergo many tests written out by their father so they are able to fit into society and live as normal high school girls. In the first episode, they are fifteen years old, but have never been in a convenience store. Unlike Sumireko and Kaoruko, Kira and Yura work together to win Nozomu's favor.
 and 
Lala is voiced by Yurika Ochiai and Lulu is voiced by Shizuka Hasegawa.
The youngest set of twins in the series who live with Nozomu, their mother Miyabi, and pet goat Billy. They are affectionate towards Nozomu and claim him as their future husband which makes Billy jealous.
 and 
Ui is voiced by Kozue Yoshizumi and Koi is voiced by Natsuko Kuwatani.
Twin daughters of a veterinary doctor and in the story they help their father in the clinic. Nozomu meets them when he takes Billy to the vet clinic after he ate a fax addressed to Nozomu which got it stuck in his throat.
 and 
Ai is voiced by Chiaki Takahashi and Mai is voiced by Minako Sango.
The oldest of the twins appearing in the series.  Ai is the teacher responsible for Nozomu's, Kira's, Yura's and Keisuke's class, while Mai is the school nurse.
 and 
Sara is voiced by Kaori Mizuhashi and Sōju is voiced by Mai Kadowaki.
Twin girls who are the same in all but personality: Sōju is mild-mannered and ill-bodied, whereas Sara is rougher in her speech and more energetic. Nozomu meets Sōju while she was painting at the shrine, and Sara wanted him to be loyal to her. Sara herself has a love-hate relationship with Nozomu. They leave the city before the end of the series and come back at the end.

Miyabi is voiced by Ai Orikasa.
The mother of Lala and Lulu and the shrine maiden of Sourin Temple. Because she is a childhood friend of Nozumu's mother, she allows him to live at her temple while Nozumu's father is studying astronomy in the United States. Nozumu looks to her as a maternal figure after his deceased mother.

Billy is voiced by Chiaki Takahashi.
The Hinagiku twins' pet goat. He initially developed a dislike for Nozumu because of Lala and Lula's affections for the main character and often showed his disdain for him by means such as eating his homework, headbutting, or biting him. As the series progresses, Billy and Nozumu develop a friendly rivalry.

Kenmochi is voiced by Masaharu Satō.
The Sakurazuki twins' butler and chief bodyguard. He carries out Kira and Yura's daily tests written out by their father so they are able to fit into society and live as normal high school girls. He at first developed a dislike for Nozumu because he thought Nozumu was trying mug Kira and Yura inside a convenience store in which Nozumu was cleared of wrongdoing. His dislike for the main character continues over the series because of Kira and Yura's affections for Nozumu. At the end of the series, he eventually warms up to him, but he still keeps his suspicions in case Nozumu treats the Sakurazuki twins wrongly.

Keisuke is voiced by Reiko Kiuchi.
Nozumu's best friend and classmate. He rekindles his friendship with Nozumu after the latter returns to his home town. He is sometimes envious of Nozumu's popularity around the twins he encounters through the series.

Juntarō is voiced by Daisuke Ono.
A judo student who is a P.E. classmate of Nozumu and Keisuke. He is the leader of the Ichijō Extreme Fan Club, a small group of male students who are fiercely devoted to the adoration and protection of Kaoruko and Sumireko (the twins are unaware of the club). As a result, Nozumu is often at odds with Juntarō and his entourage because of the latter's childhood friendship with the Ichijō twins.

Yūya is voiced by Makoto Ishii.
One of Nozumu's childhood friends and an aspiring student in aeronautics. During the beach episode, he tells Nozumu he is planning on confessing his love to Kaoruko, which causes Nozomu to act strangely around the Ichijō sisters. He returns at the end of the series in which he tells Nozumu that they will be friendly and respectable rivals for Kaoruko's affections.

List of episodes

Video game
The Futakoi video game was released on December 9, 2004. It was originally planned for a November 11 release but was delayed.
A second video game,  was released August 25, 2005. Both games were made by MediaWorks for the PlayStation 2.

See also
 Futakoi Alternative

References

External links
Starchild's official Futakoi website 

2004 anime television series debuts
Dengeki G's Magazine
Harem anime and manga
Harem video games
MediaWorks games
2004 video games
PlayStation 2 games
PlayStation 2-only games
Video games developed in Japan